This article details scores and results from the 2008 NRL Under-20s season.

Regular season
 Please note – all times in fixture listings for Rounds 1–3 are Australian Eastern Daylight Saving Time. Thereafter from Sunday in Round 4 is Australian Eastern Standard Time

Round 1

Round 2

Round 3

Round 4
 Daylight Saving Time ceased in Sydney and Melbourne at 3:00am on Sunday 6 April.

Round 5

Round 6

Round 7

Round 8

Round 9

Round 10

Round 11

Round 12

Round 13

Round 14

Round 15

Round 16

Round 17

Round 18

Round 19

Round 20

Round 21

Round 22

Round 23

Round 24

Round 25

Notes: * Experimental 11 per side rules in operation

Round 26

Finals Series

Qualifying finals

Semi finals

Preliminary finals

Grand final

References

Results